Kedestes lema, the Lema ranger, is a butterfly in the family Hesperiidae. It is found in Angola, the Democratic Republic of the Congo, Malawi, Zambia and Zimbabwe. The habitat consists of Brachystegia woodland.

Adults are on wing from December to April.

Subspecies
Kedestes lema lema (Angola, Democratic Republic of the Congo: Shaba, Zambia)
Kedestes lema linka Evans, 1956 (Malawi, Zambia, eastern Zimbabwe)

References

Butterflies described in 1910
l